The Battle of Basantar also known as the Battle of Shakargarh or Battle of Barapind (December 4–16, 1971) was one of the vital battles fought as part of the Indo-Pakistani War of 1971 in the western sector of India. The Indian troops won a hard-fought battle that secured this area in the Punjab/Jammu sector. The name Battle of Basantar actually encompasses the entire gamut of battles and skirmishes fought in the Shakargarh sector.

Location of battle
Basantar river is a tributary of the Ravi River that flows in the states of Punjab and Himachal Pradesh. This battle took place in the Shakargarh Sector or the Shakargarh Bulge that includes Jarpal and surrounding areas. The bulge is a protrusion of Pakistan boundary into Indian territory. It was a strategic area for both sides as it comprised road links to Jammu from Punjab, which could be cut off by Pakistan if it wished to launch an offensive. It was also economically vital for both sides as it straddled the fertile area of the Indus river belt.

Reasoning behind the battle
As the war began on the eastern front, Pakistan decided to open up the western sector to divert Indian troops from the Eastern front in Bangladesh and prolong the war. Shakargarh bulge was a key strategic area for India as it comprised road links between Jammu and Indian Punjab. Therefore, securing the region was crucial for India as Pakistan had a military base nearby in Sialkot and therefore could have easily launched a massive invasion of the Shakargarh region, cutting Jammu and Kashmir from the rest of India. The Indian Army maintained a base at Pathankot, twenty three miles away from Shakargarh and quickly mobilized forces to defend the region. In an attempt to gain advantage through the element of surprise, the Indian Army, though outnumbered, attacked Pakistani positions in Jarpal area, triggering the Battle of Basantar.

Battle plan
Both the opposing sides were led by their army's I Corps. Pakistan's I Corps included three infantry divisions, one armoured division, an armoured brigade backed up by an unknown number of artillery and support units. Furthermore, Pakistan had the advantage of bringing in the reserve troops stationed nearby. The reserves totalled 5 divisions, commanded by Lt. General Irshad Hassan Khan, who as DMI (Director Military Intelligence) had failed to act in the 1965 War in spite of intercepting Indian war plans.

David R. Higgins suggests that the Pakistani forces included the 8th Infantry Division with four brigades, the 15th Infantry Division, the 8th Armoured Brigade with the 13th Lancers, 27th Cavalry, 31st Cavalry (Pakistan), and possibly 15th (SP) Regiment and 29th Battalion, Frontier Force Regiment attached.

The Indian I Corps had three infantry divisions, two Armoured Brigades, two independent artillery brigades and an engineer brigade. The aim of the Indian Army was to bridge the Basantar river — the entry to which was fully land mined — and take control of the Shakargarh bulge. It was reasoned that such an offensive would also secure the Pathankot army base from any attacks from Pakistan.

The battle

The offensive in this sector was launched a few days after war broke out between the two nations. The Indian I Corps moved into the sector to capture the key areas. The 54 Infantry Division under Major General WAG Pinto and 16 Armoured Brigade moved towards the area. As they advanced they were met series of minefields and by stiff Pakistani resistance. A troop of T-55 Tanks with trawls, created and trained by Capt. JDS Jind, of the 7th Light Cavalry were attached for trawling with 16 (Independent) Armoured Brigade at the outbreak of hostilities on 3 December 1971, during the Indo-pak war. The entire trawling ahead of 54 Infantry Division, led by 16 (Independent) Armoured Brigade was done by this troop. This allowed the Tanks to move ahead before the "all vehicle safe lane was cleared by the Engineers. Thus, while the Indian division was bogged down as the engineers had not cleared all the mines, 2nd Lieutenant Arun Khetarpal of the 17 Poona Horse, in a daring counter-attack, led his 3 tanks into the minefield area. A fierce tank battle ensued where a Pakistani tank was taken down. After suffering initial setbacks, the 8th Armoured Brigade of Pakistan was called in to help the Pakistani resistance in the area. However, the Indian Army continued the assault and Lt. Arun Khetarpal with his 2 remaining tanks fought off and destroyed 10 tanks before he was killed in action. Following the defeat in the battle, Pakistan launched a massive counter-attack which was planned in five phases:

Ph I To capture North Portion of Lalial Res forest and beat back any local counter-attack (2145h on 15 Dec 71)
Ph II to capture Jarpal and Lohal by 0500h 16 dec 71.
Ph III To Est Bridge H incl area North of Lalial Forest, Jarpal and Lohal on Ni 15/16 Dec 71.
Ph IV To Break out

After days of intense fighting that saw both sides gaining and losing territory, the battle was turning into a stalemate. However, despite being at a quantitative and qualitative disadvantage, Indian troops made massive gains during the final days of the battle and also repelled the Pakistani thrust. Towards the tail end of the battle, Pakistan Army's Lieutenant Colonel Akram Raja made a frantic attempt to counter-attack the Indian stronghold near Shakargarh by jumping into an old-style cavalry charge with his tanks. Launched in broad daylight in view of the Indian defensive positions which were well secured, the campaign was a disaster. The Indians continued their military thrust deep inside Pakistan and came threateningly close to the Pakistan Army base at Sialkot. Because of being outnumbered by the advancing Indian Army, the Pakistan Army called-in the Pakistan Air Force to repel the Indian attack on the base. Expecting another massive assault by the Indian Army, this time backed by Indian Air Force-support, and in no position to launch any counter-offensive operations in the region, Pakistan offered unconditional surrender which led to ceasefire. India had gained control of more than thousand square miles before finally settling down to  - 1000 km² of Pakistan territory that included approximately 500 villages. 1 corps has 6 trawls from 7 cavalry under command of Capt. JDS Jind, that cleared 6 of the 9 attempted lanes, paving way for the Indian tanks to advance ahead.

9 Engineer Regiment at Battle of Basantar

Pakistani tanks destroyed by Indian tanks inducted into enemy territory through a safe passage created by the Sappers of 9 Engineer Regiment.
 The 9 Engineer Regiment, which comprised South Indian troops affectionately called ‘Thambis’ (meaning 'Little brother' in Tamil), was placed under the command of 54 Infantry Division. The regiment comprised three field companies, namely 404, 405 and 406, which were individually allotted to each of the three Infantry Brigades of 54 Infantry Division. At the commencement of the 1971 Indo-Pak war, 9 Engineer Regiment was to assist its sister battalion, 5 Engineer Regiment, in support of its offensive in the Samba-Zafarwal sector. The advance was through a seemingly impassable terrain, fortified at a number of places by Pakistan forces which had also laid extensive minefields all along likely approach routes of ingress.

On December 5, 1971, at about 7.30 pm, 2/Lt NP Singh of 9 Engineer Regiment left with his task force for Dera Post from where they started laying an operational track for the Indian offensive. At about 9.30 pm, the leading task force entered Pakistani territory. The Regiment's Commanding Officer, Lt Col BT Pandit, after briefly supervising this specialised task, proceeded ahead in order to guide his men. He came out very successfully in this delicate task. He was later awarded with the coveted Vir Chakra..

On December 6, at about 2.30 pm, the track was completed up to Badala-Gujran in Pakistan. On December 7, for breaching the minefield in area Thakurdwara, 404 Field Company of 9 Engineer Regiment was placed under the command of 47 Infantry Brigade from 8 pm onwards. Nearby, the other field company of 9 Engineer Regiment - 405 Field Company-in conjunction with trawls, breached a vehicle safe lane, five metre-wide and 500 metre-long, in one hour. Thereafter, a field company of 5 Engineer Regiment and a platoon of 404 Field Company widened this lane by one metre.

The Sappers laying an operational track

On December 8, 404 Field Company, on completing its task with 47 Infantry Brigade, was earmarked for providing engineer support to 91 Infantry Brigade. Simultaneously, 405 Field Company was rendered engineering support for the advance of 16 (Independent) Armoured Brigade in the area south and south-west of Bari. Meanwhile, 406 Field Company extended the operational track beyond Tarakwal. On December 9, 404 Field Company was earmarked for 76 Infantry Brigade. The operational track was then connected to Bari following which the maintenance of the entire length of track continued.

On the night of December 10/11, a platoon of 405 Field Company, deployed with 16 (Independent) Armoured Brigade and commanded by Nb Sub Doraiswamy, was employed on minefield breaching task with trawls. At about 11pm, the build-up of armour into the bridgehead was seriously hampered as one of the damaged Indian tanks obstructed traffic through the lane. Reopening of the lane was of utmost importance in order to successfully ensure the defence of the bridgehead, which would have otherwise been seriously jeopardised.

Nb Sub Doraiswamy, on his own initiative, took a small party forward through the Pakistani artillery barrage and succeeded in hand-breaching a detour round the stalled tank ensuring speedy induction of Indian armour and essential infantry support weapons through the minefield and into the bridgehead. For displaying this exemplary courage he was honoured with Vir Chakra.

On December 11, a diversion on Road Mawa-Pangdaur was constructed for the free movement of vehicles. Three reconnaissance patrols of 404 Field Company advanced with 91 Infantry Brigade to three different points for minefield reconnaissance. A second minefield lane was lined with the operational track on December 12. Simultaneously, 405 Field Company also cleared a minefield lane for the Armoured Brigade and, on December 13 night, it breached an enemy minefield with trawls 1,300 metre-deep, north of Lohara and further extended it up to Lohara.

On December 15, an Engineer Task Force comprising elements of 404, 405 and 406 Field Companies was grouped with 47 Infantry Brigade for crossing Basantar in Lagwal area.The task involved extension of the operational track from Lohara to Lagwal, breaching of an enemy minefield at Basantar, improvement of crossing places in the riverbed and construction of crossing places on two boggy nullahs which were subsidiary obstacles.

The work commenced at 8 pm on December 15 and was carried out under intense Pakistani small arms, tanks and artillery fire. The Task Force, under Maj VR Choudhary, was deployed for breaching minefield and constructing a passage for tanks and other vehicles through the river Basantar in Lagwal area. On reaching the obstacle at about 8.30 pm, the Task Force found the situation very confusing on account of intense shelling and small arms fire which was further aggravated because of scanty information about the obstacle itself. As conventional reconnaissance would have taken considerable time, the Task Force Commander decided to disregard normal drills and safety precautions and to send a small party on a wide frontage at normal walking speed.

Sensing the urgency of the situation, Capt Revinder Nath Gupta volunteered for this hazardous task and led a small party of junior commissioned officer and two other ranks right up to the far edge of the minefield. Despite the grave risk involved and very intense enemy fire, he and his party brought back vital data by 9.30 pm which enabled the task to be successfully completed by 2.30 pm on December 16.

This enabled 17 Horse with two companies to be inducted into the bridgehead by 3 pm, well in time to take on the enemy's counter-attacks and eventually led to the destruction of his armoured formation west of river Basantar. Subsequently, when the enemy put up in a counter-attack, Capt Gupta personally guided tanks of 17 Horse through the cleared minefield lane for which marking was still in progress. While working on improving the crossing, he was among those killed on December 17 by enemy artillery fire which also claimed the lives of Majors VR Choudhary and SS Malik, 2/Lt KM Mandanna, two junior commissioned officers and two other ranks. Maj SP Sharma and 12 other ranks were also wounded in the shelling. For their exemplary bravery, Maj VR Choudhary and Capt Ravinder Nath Gupta were posthumously decorated with Maha Vir Chakra and Vir Chakra respectively.

Operations ceased at 8 pm on December 17. The War Diary of the regiment records: “After overcoming the initial shock of the death of our gallant officers and junior commissioned officers, the Thambis’morale is high and we are prepared to breach more Basantars."

For their heroic exploits, the 9 Engineer Regiment was bestowed the Battle Honor "Basantar" and Theatre Honor "Punjab"  and is proudly called "Basantar Regiment or Basantar R" the companies called Barkhania, Chakra, Thakurdwara and Lohra.

Conclusion

Invading Shakargarh bulge was one of the most crucial components of Pakistan's war strategy in the western sector. Pakistan hoped that by occupying the bulge, the main link between Indian Army positions in Kashmir and Pathankot would be cut-off, following which, it could easily invade Jammu and Kashmir. Pakistani military forces stationed in Sialkot base would keep Pathankot at bay, thwarting any Indian attempts to recapture Shakargarh. However, Pakistan's battle plans were jeopardized because of the ingenuity of a bold attack by the Indians. The Indian Army attacked Pakistani positions in the region within four days of the declaration of the state of war, catching the Pakistanis by complete surprise. After a few days of intense fighting, the Indians had not only pushed the Pakistanis back, but had also come close to capturing Sialkot.

Pakistan Army generally regards this as their most humbling defeat, next only to the Battle of Longewala despite some numerical and qualitative superiority over the opposing force, the entire military campaign in the region was not successful for Pakistan. In this battle alone, India had destroyed close to 46 tanks losing only a few in the process. Pakistan's Hamoodur Rahman Commission recommended that the Commander 1 Corps, who "surrendered to the enemy without a fight" should "be tried for criminal and wilful neglect of duty" and poor conduct of operations, that "seriously jeopardized the Army offensive in the south. The Indian Army, on the other hand, was criticized for their somewhat timid handling of the attack on Sialkot. The army, however, in its defense stated that it was planning another assault on Sialkot with assistance from the Indian Air Force, when the cease-fire was declared.

This and other battles put paid to any hopes of bargaining for territory lost in East Pakistan, by capturing Indian territory; in fact Pakistan lost around 15,000 km² territory in West Pakistan, However it was returned to Pakistan after Shimla Agreement.

The Pakistan Patton tank, now an attraction for visitors to the Tank Bund Road in the South Indian city of Hyderabad, is a War Trophy given to the 54th Infantry Division, and is one that the Indian Army had disabled during the Battle of Basantar in Pakistan, between December 15–17, 1971. The 47 Infantry Brigade, part of the 54th Infantry Division, was christened Basantar Brigade after the war.

Awards

Lt Col Mohammed Akram Raja was awarded Hilal-i-Jurat by the Pakistan Government on the basis of a citation written by Lt Col Ved Airy, who was Commanding Officer, 3 Grenadiers, Indian Army

In Popular Culture
1971: Beyond Borders (2017)  directed by Major Ravi (with Mohanlal as Colonel Mahadevan fourth in Major Mahadevan film series, modeled on Hoshiar Singh Dahiya Param Vir Chakra and Allu Sirish as Arun Khetarpal Param Vir Chakra PVC, Arunoday Singh as Col. Raza (Pakistan).

References

External links
Battle of Barapind-Jarpal
Hamoodur Rahman Commission Report Chapter 5
Poona Horse account of the battle
A newspaper format presentation of the battle
Casualties during war

Basantar Brigade pays tribute to war heroes
Mod.nic.in
9 Engineer Regiment in Battle of Basantar

Basantar
Basantar 1971
Battles of the Bangladesh Liberation War
Basantar
1971 in India
1971 in Pakistan
1971 in Bangladesh
December 1971 events in Asia